Cymbopogon winterianus, common name java citronella, is a perennial aromatic plant from the family Poaceae, originating in western Malesia. Used in perfumery products and cosmetics, a source of Citronella oil.

References

winterianus
Grasses of Asia
Flora of Malesia